Schwarzburg may refer to: 
 Schwarzburg (municipality)
 The House of Schwarzburg
 Schwarzburg-Rudolstadt
 Schwarzburg-Sondershausen
 House of Schwarzburg
 13th-century fortress built by the Teutonic Order in Transylvania, present day Codlea